Ronald Kay Getoor (9 February 1929, Royal Oak, Michigan – 28 October 2017, La Jolla, San Diego, California) was an American mathematician.

Getoor received from the University of Michigan bachelor's degree in 1950, master's degree in 1951, and Ph.D. in 1954 under Arthur Herbert Copeland with thesis Connections between operators in Hilbert space and random functions of second order. As a postdoc he was an instructor at Princeton University. He became in 1956 an assistant professor and then full professor at the University of Washington. During the academic year 1964–1965 he was a visiting professor at Stanford University. From 1966 until his retirement in 2000 he was a professor at the University of California, San Diego.

Getoor's research deals with probability theory, especially the theory of Markov processes and potential theory. In 1970 he was an invited speaker at the International Congress of Mathematicians in Nice. He was elected a Fellow of the Institute of Mathematical Statistics and in 2012 a Fellow of the American Mathematical Society.

Scientific work

In the late 1950s, Getoor and  Richard Blumenthal set out to understand the work of Gilbert Hunt on the connection between Markov processes and potential theory, extending the connections between Brownian motion and Newtonian potential theory.
Getoor's book on 'Markov processes and potential theory', co-authored with  Richard Blumenthal, became a reference on the topic.

Together with Blumenthal and Sharpe, Getoor obtained many results on the fine structure of Markov processes and martingales, in particular the theory of local time for Markov processes.

With Michael J. Sharpe, Getoor defined the notion of 'conformal martingale', which proved to be influential in potential theory, investigated the behavior of Bessel processes, last-exit times and excursions. Starting in the early 1980s, Getoor  studied stationary extensions of a given strong Markov process, with time extending to infinity in both directions, formulating a pathwise view of "time reversal" which  became a key tool in his studies of the excessive measures of a Markov process.

The 'Blumenthal-Getoor index', a concept which characterises the nature of discontinuities of Lévy processes and semi-martingales, is named after him.

Personal life

He married in 1959. His wife Ann Getoor worked on the design of commercial aircraft at Boeing, and his daughter Lise Getoor is a professor of computer science at the University of Maryland. Ronald Kay Getoor died at home on October 28, 2017 in La Jolla at the age of 88.

Books
  
 with Robert McCallum Blumenthal:

Articles

with R. K. Getoor:

References

External links
Getoor, Ronald K., Royal Oak High School Hall of Fame

1929 births
2017 deaths
Probability theorists
University of Michigan alumni
University of Washington faculty
University of California, San Diego faculty
Fellows of the Institute of Mathematical Statistics
Fellows of the American Mathematical Society
People from Royal Oak, Michigan